Claus en Kaan Architecten was a Dutch architecture firm founded in 1987 by Felix Claus and Kees Kaan, led together with partners Vincent Panhuysen and Dikkie Scipio.

History

Claus was born in 1956 in Arnheim  and Kaan was born in Breda, in 1961. They both graduated from Delft University of Technology in 1987.

They formed the firm of Claus en Kaan Architecten in 1987.

Claus en Kaan designed the master plan of the IJburg district of Amsterdam and later moved their offices to a building they designed in the district.

Kees Kaan and Felix Claus once stated that their ambition was to extinguish the schism between low practice and high theory, between architecture that serves its immediate objective and architecture that speaks over the heads of its users to colleagues and critics.

On 15 January 2014 the company released a statement announcing the ending of the partnership between Claus and Kaan as from 1 January 2014. After such ending, Felix Claus started a partnership with Dick van Wageningen.

Notable works

In 2004 opened the Dutch Embassy in Maputo, Mozambique. The building unites Dutch design and techniques with locally sourced materials and constraints, bringing the office spaces up to a European standard, whilst still taking into consideration history and the locality of the place. The Netherlands Architecture Institute publishers said of the building: "It is an exceptional building, designed to a Dutch vision yet constructed using African materials".

In 2008 Claus en Kaan completed a crematorium  in the Belgian town of Sint-Niklaas, it won the 2009 Dutch National Concrete Award, the Betonprijs and was nominated for the ESCN award in 2010. Catherine Slessor, editor of the Architectural Review called it ‘a powerful statement, evoking timelessness, elementality and a connection with nature’.

The firm designed the House of Culture and Administration in Nijverdal.

It has also designed "social housing" projects in Ypenburg, at The Hague Vinex-location under the MVRDV masterplan. The firm has completed an "upscale collection of boxy units" named Rietvelden, after the "Dutch modernist master" Gerrit Rietveld, in a suburban development in Ypenburg.

The firm also designed Mövenpick's 408-room hotel tower that opened in 2007 in Amsterdam's harbor area. The hotel has "a 20-story exterior striped in alternating bands of glass, white concrete and green granite — not unlike an enormous Popsicle."

Selected works

2012–2014  -National Military Museum, Soesterberg, Netherlands
2012	–  Supreme Court of the Netherlands, The Hague, Netherlands
2010 – Gedempte Zalmhaven, Rotterdam
2008–2012 – Central Judicial Collection Agency, Leeuwarden, Netherlands
2008–2009  -Dwelling Edmond Halleylaan, Amsterdam, Netherlands
2008  	 –  El Prat de LLobregat, Barcelona, Spain
2007–2011  -Netherlands Institute of Ecology, Wageningen, Netherlands
2006–2009  -Central Post, Rotterdam
2006–2009  -Vancouver, Rotterdam
2006–2009  -Villa Trapman, Nieuwveen, Netherlands
2006–2011  -AM Headquarters, Utrecht, Netherlands
2005–2010  -Palace of Justice, Amsterdam
2005–2008  -Local Government Office, Amsterdam
2005–2007  -CK Office, Amsterdam
2004–2010  -District Water Board Brabantse Delta on Bouvigne Estate, Breda, Netherlands
2004–2008  -Apartments Eekenhof, Enschede, Netherlands
2004–2008  -Crematorium Heimolen, Sint Niklaas, Belgium
2004–2007  -Municipal Archives 'De Bazel', Amsterdam
2004–2006  -Academy of Architecture', Amsterdam

Publications
 Berg J., Ibelings H., Claus en Kaan Architecten: Ideal Standard, Buildings 1988–2009, Amsterdam, Prototype Editions, 2009
 Forjaz J., Gaunt R., Ibelings H., Claus en Kaan Architecten. The Royal Netherlands Embassy in Mozambique, Rotterdam, NAi Publishers, 2005
 Costanzo M., Claus en Kaan. L’architettura dell’attenzione, Torino, Edilstampa, 2004
 Yamamoto R., Beauftragt: Claus en Kaan Architecten, Berlin, Aedes, 2002
 Ibelings H., Claus en Kaan. Building, Rotterdam/Beijing, NAi Publishers, 2001/2004
 Claus F., van Dongen F., Schaap T., IJburg. Haveneiland en Reitlanden: brief design plan, Rotterdam, 010 Publishers, 2001
 Claus en Kaan, Michel H., Richters C., Claus en Kaan, Amsterdam, ABC Architectuurcentrum Haarlem, 2001
 Ferrater C., Claus en Kaan. New generations in the Dutch tradition, Barcelona, Editorial Gustavo Gili, 1997

Gallery

References

External links

 Felix Claus Dick van Wageningen architecten website
 KAAN Architecten website

Architecture firms of the Netherlands
Dutch architects
Dutch furniture designers
Companies based in The Hague